Bryostroma is a genus of fungi in the class Dothideomycetes. The relationship of this taxon to other taxa within the class is unknown (incertae sedis).

Species 
 Bryostroma axillare
 Bryostroma bryi
 Bryostroma guttulatum
 Bryostroma halosporum
 Bryostroma necans
 Bryostroma rhacomitrii
 Bryostroma trichostomi

See also 
 List of Dothideomycetes genera incertae sedis

References

External links 
 Bryostroma at Index Fungorum

Dothideomycetes enigmatic taxa
Dothideomycetes genera